Meadow Hall is a private school in Lekki, Lagos, Nigeria. 

Founded in July 2002 by Kehinde Nwani, the school uses a combination of the British National Curriculum and the Nigerian Curriculum. 

The school began Meadow Hall Infant and Junior school in 2002 then expanded into Infant and Junior schools on two sites (Lekki and Ikoyi) and a College in Lekki, with a total population of about 1,100 students.

The sports facilities include football, swimming and tennis .

References

External links

Lekki
Schools in Lagos State
Educational institutions established in 2002
2002 establishments in Nigeria